John William Carnegie Kirk (1878-1962) was a British Army officer, and botanist working in South Africa and author of A British Garden Flora.

Biography
Kirk was commissioned a second lieutenant in The Duke of Cornwall's Light Infantry on 18 October 1899, and promoted to lieutenant on 16 February 1901. In August 1902 he was seconded for service under the Foreign Office, and transferred to the 3rd (East Africa) Battalion of the King's African Rifles.

Geeraar for Sultan Nur

During his time in British Somaliland he recorded many poems and translated accounts and stories in the Somali language and compiled them into a book. One of such poems was about a visit from the powerful Sultan Nur Ahmed Aman to the Habr Je'lo. The Habr Je'lo recited this geeraar praising Sultan Nur.

Works
A Grammar of the Somali Language: With Examples in Prose and Verse 1905

References

British botanists
1878 births
1962 deaths
British expatriates in South Africa
British people in British Somaliland